This list of rail trails in Massachusetts details former railroad right-of-ways in Massachusetts that have been converted to trails for public use and proposed rail trails where trails exist but have not been fully established.

Massachusetts has at least "69 rail-trails, covering 347 miles. A massive new project proposed by the Metropolitan Area Planning Council, called the Landline, seeks to connect these trails, creating a 1,400-mile network of greenways and foot trails within the Boston region. When finished (currently 45 percent of the greenway network and 60 percent of the foot trail network is complete), the network would bring trail access within a half mile of three-quarters of the region's residents, and 92 percent of residents would be within one mile of the nearest trail or path."

Established rail trails 
 Alewife Linear Park (Cambridge)
 Amesbury Riverwalk Trail
 Ashburnham Rail Trail
 Ashuwillticook Rail Trail (12 miles in North Berkshires)
 Assabet River Rail Trail southwest end (5.8 miles, Hudson to Marlboro) completed, & northeast end 3.4 miles (from South Acton station (MBTA) through Maynard to Stow)
 Bedford Narrow Gauge Trail (Bedford) a.k.a. Narrow Gauge Rail Trail
 Blackstone River Bikeway (near Worcester) a.k.a. Blackstone River Greenway
 Border to Boston Trail
 Bradford Rail Trail
 Bruce Freeman Rail Trail (Lowell to Framingham)
 Canalside Rail Trail (Turners Falls)
 Cape Cod Rail Trail (Dennis to Wellfleet)
 Clipper City Rail Trail (Newburyport)
 Columbia Greenway Rail Trail (Westfield)
 Danvers Rail Trail (Danvers)
 East Boston Greenway
 Eastern Marsh Trail (Salisbury)
 Fitchburg Cutoff Path (Belmont to Cambridge)
 Ghost Trail (Salisbury)
 Grand Trunk Trail (Massachusetts)
 Haggetts Rail Trail
 Hanover Branch Rail Trail
 Independence Greenway
 Jay McLaren Memorial Trail
 Lower Neponset River Trail a.k.a. Neponset Trail a.k.a. Neponset River Greenway
 Manhan Rail Trail (Easthampton)
 Marblehead Bike Path a.k.a. Marblehead Rail-Trail
 Mattapoisett Rail Trail
 Methuen Rail Trail (Methuen)
 Minuteman Bikeway (Bedford to Cambridge)
 Nashua River Rail Trail (Ayer to Nashua, New Hampshire)
 Newton Upper Falls Greenway
 North Central Pathway (Gardner to Winchendon)
 North Plymouth Rail Trail (Plymouth) a.k.a. Seaside Trail
 Northampton Ryan Rail Trail (part of the Mass Central Rail Trail)
 Northern Strand Community Trail: Everett, Malden, Revere, Saugus, and Lynn
 Norwottuck Rail Trail (Northampton to Belchertown) a.k.a. Norwottuck Branch Rail Trail
 Old Colony Rail Trail (Harwich and Chatham)
 Phoenix Rail Trail (Fairhaven) a.k.a. Phoenix Bike Trail
 Pierre Lallement Bike Path
 Quequechan River Rail Trail (Fall River)
 Quinebaug River Rail Trail
 Redstone Rail Trail (East Longmeadow)
 Reformatory Branch Rail Trail (Bedford to Concord) a.k.a. Reformatory Branch Trail
 Saulnier Trail (New Bedford)
 Shining Sea Bikeway (Falmouth to Woods Hole)
 Somerville Community Path
 Spencer Depot Rail Trail
 Southern New England Trunkline Trail
 Southwick Rail Trail (Southwick) (connects with Farmington Canal Heritage Trail)
 Tri-Community Greenway
 Upper Charles Rail Trail (Holliston) (Milford) a.k.a. Holliston Rail Trail  a.k.a. Milford Rail Trail (Milford Branch)
 Ware River Rail Trail 
 Wellington Greenway
 Whitney Spur Rail Trail
 World War II Veterans Memorial Trail

In planning/under construction 
 Bay Colony Rail Trail (Newton to Medfield)
 Chelsea Greenway
 Cochituate Rail Trail (Natick Center to the Saxonville section of Framingham, crossing Lake Cochituate)
 Farmington Canal Trail (connects with Southwick Rail Trail)
 Marion Pathway
 Mass Central Rail Trail (Northampton, working toward Boston) a.k.a. Wayside Trail   (Central Massachusetts Railroad)
 Mattapoisett Rail Trail
 McKnight Community Trail (Springfield)
 Norton/Mansfield Rail Trail Extension 
 Squannacook Rail Trail
 Twin Cities Rail Trail (Fitchburg to Leominster)
 Wakefield-Lynnfield Trail
 Watertown Branch Railroad (Watertown Greenway)

References

Rail trails

Mass